Scottish Ballet is the national ballet company of Scotland and one of the five leading ballet companies of the United Kingdom, alongside the Royal Ballet, English National Ballet, Birmingham Royal Ballet and Northern Ballet.  Founded in 1969, the company is based in Glasgow, the resident ballet company at the Glasgow Theatre Royal and from 2009 in their purpose-built ballet centre in Tramway Arts Centre, Glasgow.

History
Scottish Ballet is Scotland's national dance company. Its primary aim is to provide programmes of world-class dance performance and educational activity at all scales. Scottish Ballet presents a wide range of dance to audiences across Scotland, the UK and abroad – and employs 36 professional dancers, 41 staff and a part-time freelance orchestra of up to 70 musicians.

Founded by Peter Darrell and Elizabeth West as the Western Theatre Ballet in Bristol in 1957, the company moved to Glasgow in 1969 and was renamed Scottish Theatre Ballet, changing to Scottish Ballet in 1974. A year later its home theatre became the Theatre Royal, Glasgow when Scottish Opera bought it and transformed it as the first national opera house in Scotland. The Company performs across Scotland, the UK and abroad, with strong classical technique at the root of all of its work.  Its broad repertory includes new versions of the classics, seminal pieces from the 20th century modern ballet canon, signature pieces by living choreographers and new commissions. As a national company, Scottish Ballet performs at theatres in Aberdeen, Edinburgh, Glasgow and Inverness and in smaller venues throughout Scotland. The company's long history of touring internationally includes visits to China, Hong Kong, Malaysia, Portugal, Ireland and the rest of the UK. Scottish Ballet's many recent awards include the 2004 TMA Award for Outstanding Achievement in Dance in recognition of its modernisation programme and dynamic performances. Scottish Ballet's current artistic director Christopher Hampson joined the company in 2012. 

The company provides dance classes and a variety of education initiatives, including work with children and adults of all ages and abilities, and the Associate Programme which encourages aspiring young dancers to train for a career in the industry. Scottish Ballet also has close links with Royal Conservatoire of Scotland, partnering the BA Modern Ballet and M.Mus. (Pianist for Dance) degree courses.

Scottish Ballet was the first dance company in Europe to offer live audio description for the visually impaired, and maintains a programme of regular audio described performances throughout Scotland.

Repertoire
Scottish Ballet presents a broad repertoire, ranging from new versions of the classics (The Nutcracker, Cinderella), 20th century modern ballet repertoire (work by George Balanchine, Frederick Ashton), work by living choreographers (William Forsythe, Hans van Manen, Siobhan Davies) and new commissions (David Dawson, Helen Pickett, Annabelle Lopez Ochoa).

Current repertoire:

 Dangerous Liaisons (1985) by Richard Alston
 Apollo (1928) by George Balanchine
 Episodes (1959) by George Balanchine
 The Four Temperaments (1946, revised 1977) by George Balanchine
 Rubies (1967) by George Balanchine
 Five Rückert Songs (1978) by Peter Darrel
 White Man Sleeps (1988) by Siobhan Davies
 Suite From Artifact (1984, as Suite from Artifact 2004) by William Forsythe
 Twilight (1972) by Hans van Manen
 Two Pieces for HET (1997) by Hans van Manen
 Acrid Avid Jam (2001) by Ashley Page
 Cheating, Lying, Stealing (1998) by Ashley Page
 Cinderella (2005) by Ashley Page
 Nightswimming into day (2004) by Ashley Page
 The Nutcracker (2003) by Ashley Page
 The Pump Room (2005) by Ashley Page
 Refurbished Behaviour (1985, revised 2005) by Ashley Page
 Soft Underbelly (1999) by Ashley Page
 Walking in the Heat (1990) by Ashley Page
 The Snow Queen (2018) by Ashley Page
 32 Cryptograms (1996) by Ashley Page
 MiddleSexGorge (1990) by Stephen Petronio
 Agon (1957) by George Balanchine
 Afternoon of a Faun (1953) by Jerome Robbins
 In Light and Shadow (2000) by Krzysztof Pastor

 Room of Cooks (1997) by Ashley Page
 The Nutcracker – Diverts (2003) by Ashley Page
 Façade (1931/1935) by Frederick Ashton
 Sirocco (2006) by Diana Loosmore
 Othello (1971) by Peter Darrell
 The Sleeping Beauty (2007) by Ashley Page
 Ride The Beast (2007) by Stephen Petronio
 Fearful Symmetries (1994) by Ashley Page
 For M.G. – The Movie (1991) by Trisha Brown
 Chasing Ghosts (2007) by Diana Loosmore
 Romeo and Juliet (2008) by Krzysztof Pastor
 Traume (2008) by Gregory Dean
 Lull (2008) by Diana Loosmore
 Pennies from Heaven (2008) by Ashley Page
 Carmen (2009) by Richard Alston
 Workwithinwork (1998) by William Forsythe
 Petrushka (2009) by Ian Spink
 Scènes de Ballet (1947) by Frederick Ashton
 Still Life (2010) by Val Caniparoli
 From Where (2008) by Paul Liburd
 Alice (2011) by Ashley Page
 Song of the Earth (1965) by Kenneth MacMillan
 New Work (2011) by Jorma Elo

Headquarters

In June 2009 Scottish Ballet moved to new, purpose-built premises in Glasgow's Southside, next to the Tramway Theatre, which had been designed by Malcolm Fraser Architects.

Dancers

Principals 

 Constance Devernay
Marge Hendrick
 Bethany Kingsley-Garner
Sophie Martin
Barnaby Rook Bishop
 Christopher Harrison
Evan Loudon
 Andrew Peasgood

Soloists 

 Aisling Brangan
 Grace Horler
Roseanna Leney
Claire Souet
Jerome Anthony Barnes
Thomas Edwards
Jamiel Laurence
Bruno Micchiardi
Nicholas Shoesmith

First Artists 
 Melissa Parsons
 Grace Paulley
Madeline Squire
Kayla-Maree Tarantolo
Javier Andreu
 Rimbaud Patron
 Constant Vigier

Artists 

 Noa Barry
Rishan Benjamin
Hannah Cubitt
Alice Kawalek
Amy McEntee
Xolisweh Ana Richards
Anna Williams
Matthew Broadbent
James Hobley
 Jamie Reid
 Simon Shilgen
 Eado Turgeman
Aarón Venegas

Notable former dancers 

 Leigh Alderson
 Daria Klimentová
 Noriko Ohara

See also 
 Culture in Glasgow
 Scotland's National Arts Companies

References

Sources

External links 

 
 Tramway Theatre website

 
Culture in Glasgow
 
Ballet companies in the United Kingdom
Ballet
Charities based in Glasgow
1957 establishments in Scotland
Performing groups established in 1957
Arts charities